Collateral is a term used in kinship to describe kin, or lines of kin, that are not in a direct line of descent from an individual. Examples of collateral relatives include siblings of parents or grandparents and their descendants (uncles, aunts, and cousins). Collateral descent is contrasted with lineal descent: those related directly by a line of descent such as the children, grandchildren, great-grandchildren, etc. of an individual. Though both forms are consanguineal (blood relations), collaterals are neither ancestors nor descendants of a given person. In legal terminology, 'Collateral descendant' refers to relatives descended from a sibling of an ancestor, and thus a niece, nephew, or cousin.

See also
Lineal descent
Bilateral descent
Kinship
Genealogy
Rota system (collateral succession)
Agnatic seniority

References

Kinship and descent
Anthropology
Kinship terminology